George Collie (14 April 1904 – 1 July 1975) was an Irish painter. His work was part of the painting event in the art competition at the 1932 Summer Olympics.

Legacy 
Collie has paintings on display in the Hugh Lane Gallery, the Irish Writers' Centre, the Ulster Museum and the National Self-Portrait Collection of Ireland in Limerick City Art Gallery. One of his most famous works of art, "A Dublin Market" depicts a fruit and vegetable market in Smithfield, Dublin. Collie received the Taylor Scholarship in 1927 for his work "The Midday Meal" and a grant to study abroad, now held in the National Gallery of Ireland.

Collie taught a number of Irish artists including R.N. Brady, Leo Clancy, and Don Conroy. Collie began teaching classes at the Dublin Metropolitan School of Art in 1930. In 1938, he opened his own art school at Schoolhouse Lane, Molesworth Street, Dublin, where he taught in for 30 years up until his death in 1975.

References

1904 births
1975 deaths
20th-century Irish painters
Irish male painters
Olympic competitors in art competitions
People from Carrickmacross
20th-century Irish male artists